Lewin is a Germanic name, usually originating from either of two different sources, the Old English Leofwine or a variant of the Jewish Levin.  People with the name include:

 Albert Lewin (1894–1968), American film director, producer, and screenwriter
 Benjamin Lewin, founder of the Cell journal
 Bernard Lewin (1906–2003), German-born American collector of Mexican art
 Blanca Lewin, Chilean television and film actress
 Daniel M. Lewin, co-founder of Akamai Technologies, and victim of the September 11 attacks.
 David Lewin (1933–2003), American music theorist and composer
 Derek Lewin (1930–2019), English amateur international footballer
 Frank Lewin (1925–2008), American composer and teacher
 Gary Lewin (born 1964), British football physiotherapist
 Herbert G. Lewin (1914-2010), American politician
 Hugh Lewin (1939–2019), South African anti-apartheid activist and writer
 Jack Lewin (1915-1990), New Zealand public servant and trade unionist
 John Lewin (1770–1819), English-born artist, first professional artist of the colony of New South Wales 
 Jonathan S. Lewin, American neuroradiologist
 Josh Lewin, American sports commentator
 Kurt Lewin (1890–1947), German psychologist
 Louis Lewin, German pharmacologist
 Mark Lewin, American professional wrestler
 Moshe Lewin (1921–2010), historian of Russia
 Nathan Lewin, American attorney
 Nora Lewin, fictional District Attorney appearing in the Law & Order franchise
 Paula Lewin (born 1971), Bermudian sailor
 Ralph A. Lewin (1921–2008), American biologist known as "the father of green algae genetics"
 Robert Lewin (screenwriter) (1920–2004), motion picture-TV writer-producer-director
 Robert Lewin (1918–2004), Polish-born British art dealer and philanthropist
 Roger Lewin, anthropologist and science writer
 Ruthe Lewin Winegarten (1930–2004), American author, activist, and historian
 Stephen Lewin (19th century), English builder of steamboats and steam locomotives
 Terence Lewin, Admiral of the Fleet in the Royal Navy
 Walter Lewin, nuclear physicist
 William Lewin (1747–1795), English naturalist and illustrator
 Lewin Nyatanga, Welsh footballer

See also 
 Lewin, Hakkari, a historical Assyrian tribe in Hakkari, Turkey
 Levin (disambiguation)
 Levine

Jewish surnames
Surnames of Old English origin